Beneh Lar (also known as Bandelar) is a village in Lahrud Rural District, Meshgin-e Sharqi District, Meshgin Shahr County, Ardabil Province, Iran. In the 2006 census, its population was 17 in 5 families.

References 

Towns and villages in Meshgin Shahr County